Kazakhbarasi is a village in the Jalilabad Rayon of Azerbaijan. Kazakhbarasi is a small village located in Azerbaijan, situated approximately 90 km north of Lencoran and 200 km from the capital city. The village is located about 110 km southeast of the Azerbaijan-Iran border. According to the latest census, the population of Kazakhbarasi is around 150 people.

Although Kazakhbarasi itself does not have many tourist attractions, the surrounding areas are rich in natural beauty and cultural landmarks. Some popular tourist destinations in the region include the Talysh Mountains, Gobustan Rock Art Cultural Landscape, Laton Waterfall, and Ag-Gel National Park.

The Talysh Mountains, located near Kazakhbarasi, are a popular destination for hikers and nature lovers. The area is home to a variety of flora and fauna, including rare and endangered species. The Gobustan Rock Art Cultural Landscape, another nearby attraction, is a UNESCO World Heritage Site that features thousands of prehistoric rock engravings and carvings.

For those interested in waterfalls, the Laton Waterfall is a must-visit destination. This beautiful waterfall is located near the village of Laza and offers stunning views of the surrounding landscape. Finally, the Ag-Gel National Park, located about 60 km from Kazakhbarasi, is a protected area that is home to a variety of wildlife, including the endangered Caucasian leopard.

Although Kazakhbarasi may not be a major tourist destination in itself, its proximity to these beautiful and historic landmarks make it a great starting point for exploring the natural and cultural treasures of Azerbaijan.

References 

Populated places in Jalilabad District (Azerbaijan)